Vanavasi Kalyan Ashram is an Indian social welfare organization based in Jashpur, in the Chhattisgarh state of India. It focuses on the welfare activities of members of Scheduled Tribes in remote areas of India. The organization is a constituent of the Sangh Parivar, the family of organisations affiliated with the  Rashtriya Swayamsevak Sangh, (RSS).

History

The Ashram was founded in 1952 by Ramakant Keshav Deshpande (also known as Balasaheb Deshpande), an official of the Orissa State Department of Tribal Welfare, with the support of the State Government and the RSS. After Independence, Balasaheb was appointed by the then Ravi Shankar Shukla Government to work in tribal-dominated Jashpur area as ‘Regional Officer’ of the ‘Tribal Development Scheme’.  Its aim was to counter the appeal of Christian missionary schools to the tribals. Based in Jashpur (214 km from Raigarh), it established schools in Raigarh and Surguja districts - areas with large tribal populations. The Ashram grew rapidly and a permanent office was established in 1963, inaugurated by the RSS chief M. S. Golwalkar.

In 1977, during the Janata Party Government, it acquired national status (expressed in its new name, Bhāratiya Vanavāsi Kalyān Āshram). From 1978 to 1983, the number of its full-time volunteers rose from 44 to 264 (56 of whom were tribal). In Jashpur, a hospital was established, and schools, hotels, and centers for an apprenticeship in manual trades were also established in 40 villages. The programs are presently located in 312 districts throughout the country and are supervised by more than a thousand full-time workers. While most districts have primary schools, many other places have residential schools, hostels, libraries, and health centers. Important annual events include establishing medical camps, playing traditional sports, and celebrating tribal festivals.

See also

 Akhara
 Akshaya Patra Foundation
 Education in India
 Ekal Vidyalaya
 Gurukula
 History of education in the Indian subcontinent
 Rashtriya Swayamsevak Sangh
 Swami Lakshamanananda
 Vidya Bharti

References
 2.

External links
 Official Website 
 Official Karnataka State branch website
 Official Maharashtra State branch website

 Vanavasi Kalyan Ashram to form women committees in all Vanvasi districts

Hindu organizations
Sangh Parivar
Rashtriya Swayamsevak Sangh